The Nuclear Compton Telescope (NCT) is a balloon-borne Compton telescope to observe the gamma-ray sky in the energy range from a few hundred keV to several MeV. Its main goals are to improve the understanding of Galactic nucleosynthesis, gamma-ray bursts, supernovae, black holes, and more.

Instrumentation

The Compton telescope uses an array of twelve Germanium detectors with high spectral resolution to detect gamma rays. On its bottom half the detector is surrounded by a Bismuth germanate scintillator to shield it from atmospheric gamma rays. The telescope has an overall field of view (FOV) of 25% of the sky.

Flights

Since low-to-medium-energy gamma rays are only detectable from above the atmosphere, NCT is launched with a large  Helium balloon into the stratosphere. So far NCT had two successful and one unsuccessful balloon campaigns:

 A two-detector prototype was successfully test flown on 1 June 2005 from the Scientific Balloon Flight Facility, Fort Sumner, New Mexico.
 On 19 May 2009, the full instrument successfully launched from Fort Sumner in New Mexico and was able to observe the Crab pulsar.
 Unfortunately, on 28 April 2010 a launch mishap occurred at Alice Springs, Australia, when the gondola release mechanism failed, leading to the partial destruction of the gondola.

References

Telescopes